Niinisaari (Finnish), Bastö (Swedish) is an eastern neighborhood of Helsinki, Finland.

Vuosaari